Cheshmeh Qoli (also Romanized as Cheshmeh Qolī and Chashmeh Qolī; also known as ‘Aūz Āghāch and Ūzūn Āqāch) is a village in Khosrowabad Rural District, Chang Almas District, Bijar County, Kurdistan Province, Iran. At the 2006 census, its population was 153, in 36 families. The village is populated by Kurds.

References 

Towns and villages in Bijar County
Kurdish settlements in Kurdistan Province